Yuen Long Park, formerly called Yuen Long Town Park, is located in Yuen Long, New Territories, Hong Kong. It is managed by Leisure and Cultural Services Department.

History

The park was a natural woodland at Shui Ngau Ling, Yuen Long. The existing geographical pattern and trees was preserved as much as possible. The park was officially opened by Cheung Yan-lung, chairman of the Regional Council to the public on 26 October 1991.

The park was formerly called Yuen Long Town Park. It occupies 7.5 hectares.

Features
The park has a seven-level pagoda with an aviary at its base. It also has football pitches, a gateball court, children's playgrounds, fitness stations, and public toilets. The gateball pitch was the first within the service area of the Regional Council.

The park is also home to an automatic weather station, operated by the Hong Kong Observatory, which was commissioned on 20 March 2015. Temperature readings from the station are published round-the-clock on the observatory's website.

Nearby buildings 
Yuen Long Public Swimming Pool
Yuen Long Police Station
YLDSA Sports Grounds
Yuen Long Town Hall
Yuen Long Stadium
Park Royale

Gallery

See also
Leisure and Cultural Services Department
List of urban public parks and gardens in Hong Kong

References

External links

 

Urban public parks and gardens in Hong Kong
Landmarks in Hong Kong
Tourist attractions in Hong Kong
Yuen Long District